Something About Life is the debut album by English singer Hamza Robertson, released on 3 July 2007.

Composition and release
Something About Life, was released in July 2007 by Awakening Records. The album blends East and West.

Track listing

References

External links

2007 debut albums
Arabic-language albums
Hamza Robertson albums
Awakening Music albums